XHIXMI-FM is a community radio station on 107.7 FM in Ixmiquilpan, Hidalgo. It is known as La Brillante and owned by the civil association Familia Brillante, A.C.

History
La Brillante went on the air in 2014 as an unlicensed station on 107.7. The Federal Telecommunications Institute granted the group a community radio station concession on November 15, 2017.

References

Radio stations in Hidalgo (state)
Community radio stations in Mexico
Christian radio stations in Mexico
Radio stations established in 2014